Capitol News Company, LLC is an American media company based in Arlington, Virginia, United States. It is a private holding company owned by Robert L. Allbritton. Its primary publication was Politico, and acquired by Axel Springer SE, a German publisher in 2021.

History 
Capitol News Company was created when Politico (founded in 2007)  was spun out of Allbritton Communications Company in 2009. The company also publishes Politico New York, a web site and magazine focused on the politics of New York City and New York state, as well as the inner workings of the New York-based news media, and which later expanded to cover New Jersey and Florida before being rebranded as Politico websites.

In 2020, it launched Protocol, a publication covering the people, power and politics of tech.

In 2021 Politico and Protocol were acquired by Axel Springer SE, a German publisher for US$1billion.

References

2009 establishments in Virginia
American companies established in 2009
Companies based in Arlington County, Virginia
Corporate spin-offs
Mass media companies of the United States
Politico